Hirofumi Miyase (born 11 April 1971) is a Japanese professional golfer.

Miyase was born in Chiba Prefecture and would join the Japan Golf Tour after turning professional. He won his first title on the Japan Golf Tour in 1997 and would add six more wins between then and 2007.

In 2004, Miyase played on the PGA Tour in the United States after finishing T28 at qualifying school. He made only five cuts in 27 starts and lost his tour card. His best finish was a T9 at the FedEx St. Jude Classic.

Professional wins (8)

Japan Golf Tour wins (7)

Japan Golf Tour playoff record (4–2)

Other wins (1)
2007 Hirao Masaaki Charity Golf

Results in major championships

CUT = missed the half-way cut
"T" = tied
Note: Miyase only played in The Open Championship.

Results in World Golf Championships

1Cancelled due to 9/11

QF, R16, R32, R64 = Round in which player lost in match play
NT = No tournament

Team appearances
World Cup (representing Japan): 1992

See also
2003 PGA Tour Qualifying School graduates

References

External links

Japanese male golfers
Japan Golf Tour golfers
PGA Tour golfers
Sportspeople from Chiba Prefecture
1971 births
Living people